The Fillmore Herald was a newspaper serving the Fillmore, California community. Central to the life of the area even before the city's 1914 incorporation, it ceased publication in 2006.

History 
The Fillmore Herald began publication in 1907, seven years before the incorporation of Fillmore itself. It attracted immediate local attention, with the Oxnard Courier noting it as one of the county's best papers, which "looks on the bright side of things and has something to say."

As the debate over whether the town should incorporate raged in 1914, the Herald came out strongly on the side of incorporation, running editorials that "lambast[ed] those who were against incorporation as rich, uncaring boors who refused to build sidewalks in front of their plush homes for the school children that were in danger of being mowed down by one of their luxury automobiles." The incorporation measure passed.

From 1944 to 1954 it was published by Hamilton Riggs. Riggs sold it to longtime manager Brice Van Horn in 1954. Under Van Horn, the paper expanded, going to an eight-page, 11-pica format in 1959.

The 1994 Los Angeles earthquake damaged the Herald's building, forcing them to work one of the biggest stories of their history out of editor and publisher Douglas Huff's home.

At the time of its closing in 2006, it was one of Ventura County's oldest papers.

References 

Defunct newspapers published in California